Robert C. Gilman is a thinker on sustainability who, along with his late wife Diane Gilman, has researched and written about ecovillages.  The Gilmans’ work was important in giving definition to the ecovillage movement and shaping the direction of the Global Ecovillage Network.  In 1991, the Gilmans co-authored Eco-Villages and Sustainable Communities, a seminal study of ecovillages for Gaia Trust.

Also in 1991, Gilman, who was publisher of the magazine In Context, wrote an article entitled “The Eco-village Challenge” that set out a definition of an ecovillage as a:
human-scale
full-featured settlement
in which human activities are harmlessly integrated into the natural world
in a way that is supportive of healthy human development and can be successfully continued into the indefinite future. 

This definition was to become the standard definition on which the ecovillage movement was founded and is still considered by many to be the most authoritative.

From astrophysics to global sustainability
Gilman's academic training is in astrophysics.  He graduated from the University of California, Berkeley in 1967 with a bachelor's in astronomy.  He received a Ph.D. in astrophysics from Princeton University in 1969.  Gilman has taught and conducted research at the University of Minnesota, the Harvard Smithsonian Astrophysical Observatory and was a research associate at NASA's Institute for Space Studies.

Another phase of Gilman's life began in the mid 1970s when he decided that "the stars could wait, but the planet couldn't." He turned his attention to the study of global sustainability, futures research and strategies for positive cultural change. He and Diane designed and built their own solar home in 1975.   In 1979 they founded the Context Institute, one of the earliest NGOs to focus on sustainability.

In 1983 the Context Institute began publishing In Context, A Quarterly of Humane Sustainable Culture, with Gilman as editor.  In Context won Utne Reader's Alternative Press Award for "Best Coverage of Emerging Issues" in 1991 and 1994.

Gilman was a member of the Langley, Washington City Council until 2011.  He has now focused his time on the Bright Future program, including the Bright Future Now course and the Bright Future Network.

External links
Biography - Robert Gilman
Context Institute

American astronomers
Sustainability advocates
University of California, Berkeley alumni
Princeton University alumni
University of Minnesota faculty
Harvard University staff
Year of birth missing (living people)
Living people